David Marciano (born January 7, 1960, in Newark, New Jersey) is an American actor best known for his roles as Jeffery in Civil Wars (1991-1993), Detective Raymond Vecchio in the television series Due South, Detective Steve Billings in the FX police drama The Shield, Virgil in Homeland (2011-2013), Brad in Bosch (2016-2020), and Howard in Shooter (2016-2017).

Early life
Marciano grew up in north Newark. Newark was plagued by violent crime and Marciano was witness to a city in crisis. He has admitted to having a troubled youth. "I was hanging around on street corners, drinking, gambling, playing cards, going to the racetrack, shooting pool, all those kind of things." At the age of seventeen, Marciano was involved in a serious car crash after a night out partying. This prompted him to sort his life out and he enrolled at Northeastern University in Boston, Massachusetts, to study biomedical engineering. After a disappointing start Marciano transferred to economics and accounting for his second year before dropping out to pursue acting. Marciano subsequently studied Acting at Drama Studio London.

Career
In 1985, Marciano moved to California where he studied acting at the Drama Studio London in Berkeley, earning a living by working as a bartender. His big break came two years later as a guest star in Wiseguy, playing a mobster impersonating Lorenzo Steelgrave. In 1989 he played the diner owner Stanley in Pepsi's 'Diner' commercial shown in the UK.

More small parts followed, including Cop #1 in the film Lethal Weapon 2, before he played the role of bicycle messenger/poet Jeffrey Lassick in legal drama Civil Wars from 1991–1993. He was then cast as Detective Raymond Vecchio in Due South in 1994. He played the part for two seasons before his character was written out, replaced by Detective Stanley Kowalski (Callum Keith Rennie), due to filming commitments. He returned for the series finale in 1999 where Vecchio and Kowalski's ex-wife got together. He then appeared in the 1996 season 3 episode of Touched By An Angel entitled "Into The Light" playing a dying man in need of a heart transplant. Later he took the role of Giorgio Clericuzio in the 1997 mini-series of Mario Puzo's The Last Don.

He has appeared in episodes of various TV shows, including Diagnosis: Murder, Midnight Caller, Judging Amy, Nash Bridges, JAG, The Division, NYPD Blue, NCIS, CSI: New York and CSI: Crime Scene Investigation and SeaQuest DSV.

Between 2005–2008, he played Detective Steve Billings in The Shield. Since then, he has appeared in episodes of Joan of Arcadia, House, Lie to Me, Sons of Anarchy, and Battle Creek. Between 2011 and 2013, he played the recurring role of Virgil in Homeland.

In 2015-2016, Marciano played recurring roles in the Amazon original series Bosch and Syfy's 12 Monkeys. Most recently, he has been cast in a pilot for USA Network's Shooter.

Personal life
In 1991, Marciano married Katayoun Amini (who played Vecchio's ex-wife Angie in Due South) and together they have two daughters and one son. They are divorced.

Filmography

Film

Television

Awards

References

External links

1960 births
Living people
Male actors from Newark, New Jersey
American people of Italian descent
American male film actors
American male television actors
21st-century American male actors
20th-century American male actors